The Rhode Island Rebellion were an American semi-professional rugby league football team based in Providence, Rhode Island. The Rebellion compete in the USA Rugby League (USARL), which they joined as a charter franchise in the 2011 season.

History
The club was established in 2011 by Lawrence Almagno, Alex DeCiccio, and Anthony Nardolillo, as a charter member of the USA Rugby League. Together with Oneida FC and the New Jersey Turnpike Titans, they were one of three new teams to join the USARL, which was formed by clubs that had broken with the established American National Rugby League (AMNRL). The USARL had originally intended to establish a team in New York City, sponsored by Kodiak Capital Group, and named Kodiak Rugby. Almagno, a Kodiak employee, was one of the planners charged with setting up the team, but the group was unable to find a suitable venue in New York. Thereafter Almagano just having moved back to Rhode Island contacted DeCiccio in order to determine if Rhode Island had a large enough player pool to form a new team. After the first team meeting, Nardolillio joined Almagno and DeCiccio to assist in the task of bringing the team to Providence, Rhode Island. The move gave the USARL four teams in New England.

Almagno, who had experience playing both rugby league and rugby union, got together with former teammates DeCiccio and Nardolillo to recruit players. After initial difficulty finding players, they were able to recruit a full roster in time for the inaugural 2011 USARL season. They achieved their first win of the season in game four against the New Jersey Turnpike Titans. During their inaugural season the Rebellion attracted around 300 fans a game and was able to cover its expenses.

In 2014, with the growth of the USARL, the club was moved into the North East Division.

Youth development
The club run the American Youth Rugby League Association’s Providence High School Rugby League Competition in Rhode Island that involves 1,000 middle school students.

Alongside the Boston 13s, a four team U23 competition is also run in the Massachusetts and Rhode Island regions.

International representatives

In 2015 Shain Singleton represented the United States national rugby league team USA Hawks in a match against Canada rugby league during game 2 of the Colonial Cup where 2 tries were scored directly off of his attacking kicks. In 2015 Jonathan St. John represented the United States Pioneers in a match against the Leeds Rhinos.

Season summaries

See also
Rugby league in the United States
List of defunct rugby league clubs in the United States

References

External links
 usarl.com

2011 establishments in Rhode Island
Rugby clubs established in 2011
Rugby league in Rhode Island
Sports in Providence, Rhode Island
Sports teams in Rhode Island
USA Rugby League teams